The 1970–71 season was the 10th season of the Baltimore Bullets in the NBA. This would be its first year in the newly created Central Division inside the Eastern Conference. Despite playing close to .500 basketball all season, the Bullets would capture the Central Division with a 42–40 record.

Draft picks

The Baltimore Bullets made seventeen selections in the 1970 NBA Draft.

Roster

Regular season

Season standings

Record vs. opponents

Game log

Playoffs
In the playoffs the Bullets would get off to a quick start as they grabbed a 3–1 series lead over the Philadelphia 76ers. However, the Bullets would find themselves in a 7th game and that game the Bullets would emerge victorious 128–120. The Bullets would face the New York Knicks in the Eastern Conference Finals. The Bullets would finally break through in Game 5 and break the tie in the series by beating the Knicks at Madison Square Garden 89–84. The Bullets would have a chance to close the series out at home, but the Knicks would bounce back with a 113–96 win to force a 7th and deciding game in New York. In the seventh game, the Bullets would triumph, winning in New York by 2 points to reach the NBA Finals.However, the Bullets would be swept in 4 straight games by the Milwaukee Bucks.

|- align="center" bgcolor="#ffcccc"
| 1
| March 24
| Philadelphia
| L 112–126
| Loughery, Gus Johnson (19)
| Wes Unseld (20)
| Kevin Loughery (4)
| Baltimore Civic Center6,707
| 0–1
|- align="center" bgcolor="#ccffcc"
| 2
| March 26
| @ Philadelphia
| W 119–107
| Marin, Monroe (24)
| Wes Unseld (18)
| Earl Monroe (6)
| Spectrum10,369
| 1–1
|- align="center" bgcolor="#ccffcc"
| 3
| March 28
| Philadelphia
| W 111–103
| Earl Monroe (29)
| Wes Unseld (24)
| Kevin Loughery (7)
| Baltimore Civic Center5,589
| 2–1
|- align="center" bgcolor="#ccffcc"
| 4
| March 30
| @ Philadelphia
| W 120–105
| Jack Marin (27)
| Gus Johnson (14)
| Earl Monroe (6)
| Spectrum8,909
| 3–1
|- align="center" bgcolor="#ffcccc"
| 5
| April 1
| Philadelphia
| L 103–104
| Earl Monroe (26)
| Wes Unseld (18)
| Kevin Loughery (5)
| Baltimore Civic Center10,998
| 3–2
|- align="center" bgcolor="#ffcccc"
| 6
| April 3
| @ Philadelphia
| L 94–98
| Earl Monroe (30)
| Wes Unseld (18)
| Kevin Loughery (5)
| Spectrum7,059
| 3–3
|- align="center" bgcolor="#ccffcc"
| 7
| April 4
| Philadelphia
| W 128–120
| Jack Marin (33)
| Wes Unseld (22)
| Gus Johnson (8)
| Baltimore Civic Center6,662
| 4–3
|-

|- align="center" bgcolor="#ffcccc"
| 1
| April 6
| @ New York
| L 111–112
| Earl Monroe (29)
| Wes Unseld (22)
| Earl Monroe (4)
| Madison Square Garden19,500
| 0–1
|- align="center" bgcolor="#ffcccc"
| 2
| April 9
| @ New York
| L 88–107
| John Tresvant (20)
| Wes Unseld (20)
| Kevin Loughery (16)
| Madison Square Garden19,500
| 0–2
|- align="center" bgcolor="#ccffcc"
| 3
| April 11
| New York
| W 114–88
| Earl Monroe (31)
| Wes Unseld (26)
| Wes Unseld (9)
| Baltimore Civic Center8,083
| 1–2
|- align="center" bgcolor="#ccffcc"
| 4
| April 14
| New York
| W 101–80
| Jack Marin (27)
| John Tresvant (17)
| Wes Unseld (6)
| Baltimore Civic Center12,289
| 2–2
|- align="center" bgcolor="#ffcccc"
| 5
| April 16
| @ New York
| L 84–89
| Jack Marin (25)
| John Tresvant (17)
| Wes Unseld (3)
| Madison Square Garden19,500
| 2–3
|- align="center" bgcolor="#ccffcc"
| 6
| April 18
| New York
| W 113–96
| Earl Monroe (27)
| Wes Unseld (15)
| Earl Monroe (7)
| Baltimore Civic Center11,211
| 3–3
|- align="center" bgcolor="#ccffcc"
| 7
| April 19
| @ New York
| W 93–91
| Earl Monroe (26)
| Wes Unseld (20)
| Earl Monroe (6)
| Madison Square Garden19,500
| 4–3
|-

|- align="center" bgcolor="#ffcccc"
| 1
| April 21
| @ Milwaukee
| L 88–98
| Earl Monroe (26)
| John Tresvant (14)
| Fred Carter (4)
| Milwaukee Arena10,746
| 0–1
|- align="center" bgcolor="#ffcccc"
| 2
| April 25
| Milwaukee
| L 83–102
| Jack Marin (22)
| Wes Unseld (20)
| Earl Monroe (6)
| Baltimore Civic Center12,289
| 0–2
|- align="center" bgcolor="#ffcccc"
| 3
| April 28
| @ Milwaukee
| L 99–107
| Jack Marin (21)
| Wes Unseld (23)
| Wes Unseld (6)
| Milwaukee Arena10,746
| 0–3
|- align="center" bgcolor="#ffcccc"
| 4
| April 30
| Milwaukee
| L 106–118
| Fred Carter (28)
| Wes Unseld (23)
| Wes Unseld (10)
| Baltimore Civic Center11,842
| 0–4
|-

Awards and honors
Gus Johnson, All-NBA Second Team
Gus Johnson, NBA All-Defensive First Team

References

Bullets on Basketball Reference

Baltimore
Washington Wizards seasons
Eastern Conference (NBA) championship seasons
Baltimore Bullets
Baltimore Bullets